The 1951–52 Ranji Trophy was the 18th season of the Ranji Trophy. Bombay won the title defeating Holkar in the final.

Highlights
 Mysore lost by an innings and 7 runs to Bombay despite conceding a first innings lead of only 35. The second innings total of 28 all out is the lowest total by Mysore/Karnataka in first class cricket.
 Bombay defeated Holkar by 531 runs in the final. As of 2020, it is the second largest margin of win by runs in Ranji Trophy, after Bengal's 540 run win over Orissa in 1953-54

Zonal Matches

West Zone

North Zone

South Zone

East Zone

Inter-Zonal Knockout matches

Final

Scorecards and averages
Cricketarchive

References

External links

1952 in Indian cricket
Indian domestic cricket competitions
Ranji Trophy seasons